In mathematics, the Fictitious domain method is a method to find the solution of a partial differential equations on a complicated domain , by substituting  a given  problem
posed on a domain , with a new problem posed on a simple domain  containing .

General formulation
Assume in some area  we want to find solution  of the equation:

 

with boundary conditions:

 

The basic idea of fictitious domains method is to substitute  a given  problem
posed on a domain , with a new problem posed on a simple shaped domain  containing .

Problem in the extended domain  for the new solution :

 

 

It is necessary to pose the problem in the extended area so that the following condition is fulfilled:

Simple example, 1-dimensional problem

Prolongation by leading coefficients 

 solution of problem:

 
Discontinuous coefficient  and right part of equation previous equation we obtain from expressions:

 
 

Boundary conditions:

 

Connection conditions in the point :

 

where  means:

 

Equation (1) has analytical solution therefore we can easily obtain error:

Prolongation by lower-order coefficients
 solution of problem:

 

Where  we take the same as in (3), and expression for 

 

Boundary conditions for equation (4) same as for (2).

Connection conditions in the point :

 

Error:

Literature

 P.N. Vabishchevich, The Method of Fictitious Domains in Problems of Mathematical Physics, Izdatelstvo Moskovskogo Universiteta, Moskva, 1991.
 Smagulov S. Fictitious Domain Method for Navier–Stokes equation, Preprint CC SA USSR, 68, 1979.
 Bugrov A.N., Smagulov S. Fictitious Domain Method for Navier–Stokes equation, Mathematical model of fluid flow, Novosibirsk, 1978, p. 79–90

Domain decomposition methods
Applied mathematics